Kevin Greenaugh (born May 15, 1956) is an American nuclear engineer and senior manager at the National Nuclear Security Administration (NNSA) in Washington, DC, United States.

Early life and education 
Born in the United Kingdom as a U.S. military dependent, Greenaugh has been a part of the military and commercial energy industry for the duration of his career. After attending school in Berlin during the Cold War, the family moved to Augusta, Georgia and experienced segregation. Greenaugh attended college early and became the first African American to receive a doctorate in Nuclear Engineering at the University of Maryland.

Greenaugh received his Bachelors in Chemistry from Mercer University, a Masters in Nuclear Engineering from the University of New Mexico (Albuquerque), a Masters in Public Policy from the University of New Mexico (Santa Fe), post-Masters studies at the University of Arizona, and his doctorate in Nuclear Engineering from the University of Maryland. He received an engineering certificate in Technology from Massachusetts Institute of Technology.

Career 
Greenaugh is a member of the Senior Executive Service and the Assistant Deputy Administrator for Strategic Partnership Programs of the National Nuclear Security Administration (NNSA).  He served as the senior advisor for Policy to the Administrator of NNSA.

Greenaugh has participated in Congressional hearings and provided briefings to members of the House and Senate. He testified at a hearing of the Senate Foreign Relations Committee and briefed the Senate Armed Services Committee on the science and systems of the nuclear deterrent. He manages a program involving the defense of planet earth from improbable collision of near-earth-objects and has published technical papers on the topic, quoted in the New York Times and Physics Today (February, 2017). The research has yielded two technical reports for NASA: "Studies of Short Time Response Options for Potentially Hazardous Objects: Current and Forthcoming Results"  and "Multi-Organization – Multi-Discipline Effort Developing a Mitigation Concept for Planetary Defense."

Greenaugh has over 35 years’ experience working in the nuclear enterprise and energy industry.  He worked at MITRE Corporation, where he was one of the primary consultants in the Energy Resources Division and worked national energy issues such as extending the life of the Strategic Petroleum Reserve. In addition, Dr. Greenaugh worked for eight years as a scientist and engineer at Los Alamos National Laboratory, where he published numerous technical reports on his research activities pertaining to Energy and Nuclear Non-proliferation.

Greenaugh has been an adjunct professor at Howard University for over twenty-five years, where he teaches courses of the School of Engineering. He has also taught classes at the US Air Force Academy. 

He is a member of the Omega Psi Phi fraternity's Gamma Zeta chapter.

Awards 
In 2006, he was awarded the Black Engineer of the Year award for achievement in government, by Career Communications and cited at the A. James Clark School of Engineering, University of Maryland. He also received the Centennial Award for Science from the Omega Psi Phi fraternity in 2011, the National Trail Blazer Award in Science and proclamations from multiple cities.

References

External links 
Engineer of The Year
Famous Mercer University Alumni
Augusta Chronicle
Sandia Lab News
NASA Launch (Test Capabilities)
Richmond County News
Jet Magazine

1956 births
Living people
African-American engineers
21st-century American engineers
African-American scientists
American scientists
American nuclear engineers
University of Maryland, College Park alumni
Mercer University alumni
University of New Mexico alumni
University of Arizona alumni
Massachusetts Institute of Technology alumni
Harvard Kennedy School alumni
Howard University faculty
21st-century African-American people
20th-century African-American people